Kimberley S. "Kim" Casey is a Democratic former member of the New Hampshire House of Representatives, representing the Rockingham 11th District starting in 2002.

External links
New Hampshire House of Representatives - Kimberley Casey official NH House website
Project Vote Smart - Representative Kimberley Casey (NH) profile
Follow the Money - Kimberley Casey
2006 2004 2002 campaign contributions

Members of the New Hampshire House of Representatives
1955 births
Living people
United Church of Christ members
Women state legislators in New Hampshire
21st-century American women